Golovkin (from головка meaning head) is a Russian masculine surname, its feminine counterpart is Golovkina. It may refer to

Aleksandra Golovkina (born 1998), Lithuanian figure skater
Egor Golovkin (born 1983), Russian figure skater
Gavriil Golovkin (1660–1734), Russian statesman
Gennady Golovkin (born 1982), Kazakhstani boxer 
Olga Golovkina (born 1986), Russian runner
Sergey Golovkin (1959–1996), Russian serial killer
Sofia Golovkina (1915–2004), Russian ballet dancer
Yury Golovkin (1762–1846), Russian diplomat

Russian-language surnames